The year 1901 in film involved some significant events.


Events
Edwin S. Porter is put in charge of Thomas Edison's motion-picture production company
 Thomas Edison closes "America's First Movie Studio", the Edison's Black Maria

Films released in 1901

A
 Alfred Butterworth and Sons, Glebe Mills, Hollinwood, produced by Mitchell and Kenyon – (GB)
 Another Job for the Undertaker, directed by Edwin S. Porter and George S. Fleming – (US)

B
 The Big Swallow, directed by James Williamson – (GB)
 Blue Beard (Barbe-Bleue), directed by Georges Méliès, based on the 1697 fairy tale by Charles Perrault – (France)

C
 The Countryman and the Cinematograph, directed by Robert W. Paul – (GB)
 Cunard Vessel at Liverpool, produced by Mitchell and Kenyon – (GB)

D
 The Devil and the Statue (Le Diable géant ou le Miracle de la Madone), directed by Georges Méliès – (France)
 Dream and Reality (Rêve et réalité), directed by Ferdinand Zecca – (France)

E
 Employees Leaving Alexandra Docks, Liverpool, produced by Mitchell and Kenyon – (GB)
 Excelsior!, directed by Georges Méliès – (France)

F
 Fire!, directed by James Williamson – (GB)

G
 The Gans-McGovern Fight, a documentary starring Joe Gans and Terry McGovern – (US)
 The Gordon Sisters Boxing, directed by Thomas Edison – (US)

H
 The Haunted Curiosity Shop, directed by Walter R. Booth – (GB)
 History of a Crime (Histoire d'un crime), directed by Ferdinand Zecca – (France)

I
 Inauguration of the Australian Commonwealth, documentary directed by Joseph Perry – (Australia)

J
 Jamaica Street, Glasgow, produced by Mitchell and Kenyon – (GB)

K
 Kansas Saloon Smashers, directed by Edwin S. Porter – (US)

L
 Lord Roberts' Visit to Manchester, produced by Mitchell and Kenyon – (GB)

M
 The Magic Sword, directed by Walter R. Booth – (GB)
 The Man with the Rubber Head (L'Homme à la tête en caoutchouc), directed by Georges Méliès – (France)
 Manchester Band of Hope Procession, produced by Mitchell and Kenyon – (GB)
 Manchester Street Scene, produced by Mitchell and Kenyon – (GB)
 Morecambe Church Lads' Brigade at Drill, produced by Mitchell and Kenyon – (GB)

N
 North Sea Fisheries, North Shields, produced by Mitchell and Kenyon – (GB)

P
 Panoramic View of the Morecambe Sea Front, produced by Mitchell and Kenyon – (GB)
 Parkgate Iron and Steel Co., Rotherham, produced by Mitchell and Kenyon – (GB)
 Peeping Tom (Par le trou de la serrure), directed by Ferdinand Zecca – (France)
 Pendlebury Colliery, produced by Mitchell and Kenyon – (GB)
 Pendlebury Spinning Co., produced by Mitchell and Kenyon – (GB)
 President McKinley Inauguration Footage, directed by Thomas Edison – (US)
 Preston Egg Rolling, produced by Mitchell and Kenyon – (GB)

R
 Race for the Muriatti Cup, Manchester, produced by Mitchell and Kenyon – (GB)
 Red Riding Hood (Le Petit Chaperon rouge) (lost), directed by Georges Méliès, based on the 17th century fairy tale by Charles Perrault – (France)
 Ride on the Tramcar Through Belfast, produced by Mitchell and Kenyon – (GB)
 Royal Proclamation of the Death of Queen Victoria, Blackburn, produced by Mitchell and Kenyon – (GB)

S
 Scrooge, or, Marley's Ghost, directed by Walter R. Booth, based on the 1843 novella A Christmas Carol by Charles Dickens – (GB)
 Sedgwick's Bioscope Show Front, produced by Mitchell and Kenyon – (GB)
 The Seven Castles of the Devil (Le Sept Châteaux du Diable), directed by Ferdinand Zecca – (France)
 A Sneaky Boer, produced by Mitchell and Kenyon – (GB)
 Star Theatre, directed by Frederick S. Armitage – (US)
 Stop Thief!, directed by James Williamson – (GB)

T
 Torpedo Flotilla Visit to Manchester, produced by Mitchell and Kenyon – (GB)
 Trapeze Disrobing Act, directed by Edwin S. Porter – (US)

U
 Undressing Extraordinary, directed by Walter R. Booth – (GB)
 University Procession on Degree Day, Birmingham, produced by Mitchell and Kenyon – (GB)

W
 What Happened on Twenty-third Street, New York City, directed by George S. Fleming and Edwin S. Porter – (US)

Births

Deaths
 May 9 - Charles Chaplin, Sr. (born 1863), actor and father of Charlie Chaplin.
 June 2 – James A. Herne (born 1839), actor playwright. Some of his works such as Shore Acres adapted into silent films. also father of screenwriter Julie Herne and actress Chrystal Herne.

Debut
Anna Held

References

 
Film by year
Articles containing video clips